Neyyattinkara  is a town located in south of capital city Trivandrum of Kerala, India. It may also refer to:
 Neyyattinkara (tehsil), a Taluk in Kerala
 Neyyattinkara (State Assembly constituency), a constituency in Kerala
Neyyattinkara Sree Krishna Swami Temple,A famous temple situated in neyyattinkara
Neyyattinkara Vasudevan,a Carnatic music vocalist from neyyattinkara 
Neyyattinkara railway station,a major railway station in Kerala